Royal Jordanian serves the following destinations as of June 2018. Not included are charter services operated by its subsidiary Royal Wings.

Destinations

See also
Royal Wings

References

Lists of airline destinations
Oneworld destinations